Asian Highway 72 (AH72)  is a road in the Asian Highway Network running 1172 km (728 miles) from Tehran to Bushehr, Iran. The route is as follows:

Iran
 Freeway 7: Tehran - Qom - Murcheh Khvort
: Murcheh Khvort - Shahinshahr
 Freeway 9: Shahinshahr - Isfahan
: Isfahan - Abadeh - Shiraz
: Shiraz - Qaemiyeh (Chenar Shahijan)
: Qaemiyeh (Chenar Shahijan) - Bushehr

References

External links 

 Iran road map on Young Journalists Club

Asian Highway Network
Roads in Iran
Transport in Isfahan
Transportation in Isfahan Province
Transport in Qom
Transportation in Qom Province
Transport in Shiraz
Transportation in Fars Province
Transport in Tehran
Transportation in Tehran Province